Sven-David Sandström (30 October 1942, in Motala – 10 June 2019) was a Swedish classical composer of operas, oratorios, ballets, and choral works, as well as orchestral works.

Life and career
Sandström studied art history and musicology at Stockholm University. He also studied musical composition at the Royal College of Music, Stockholm.

He was a faculty member at the Royal College of Music, Stockholm, and Indiana University Bloomington's Jacobs School of Music, where he taught for fifteen years.

Among his works are The High Mass, a Requiem, concertos for flute, guitar, piano, and cello, and the 2001 opera, Jeppe: The Cruel Comedy on a libretto and originally directed by Claes Fellbom, who commissioned the work for the centennial of the Swedish opera company.  Fellbom translated the opera into English and directed its first production in that language at Indiana University in February 2003. In 2006, Sandström's Ordet - en passion was performed on 24 March in Stockholm.  A number of his works were inspired by significant choral works by Bach and other composers, but reinterpreted in Sandström's very personal style. These include a set of the six Bach cantata texts in Bach's structure (double choir plus four-part chorale), a reinterpretation of the text of Handel's Messiah commissioned and premiered by the Oregon Bach Festival in 2009 and also performed at the Rheingau Musik Festival that year, and works by Purcell.

His work draws on ideas from modernist music, minimalist music, jazz, and popular music.  Indeed, in Act II of Jeppe, the chorus sings the line "O Lord, Won't You Buy Me a Mercedes-Benz" in harmony based on the original Janis Joplin melody.  He also incorporated elements of Tejano music in his work.

Featured students 

 Marie Samuelsson

References

Per F. Broman. Sven-David Sandström. Stockholm: Royal Academy of Music and Atlantis, 2012

External links
Sven-David Sandström on IMDb
svendavidsandstrom.com on Wayback Machine 

1942 births
2019 deaths
20th-century classical composers
21st-century classical composers
Contemporary classical music in Sweden
Indiana University faculty
Litteris et Artibus recipients
Swedish opera composers
Male opera composers
Swedish art historians
Swedish classical composers
Swedish male classical composers
20th-century Swedish male musicians
20th-century Swedish musicians
21st-century Swedish male musicians
People from Motala Municipality
Deaths from cancer in Sweden
Musikförläggarnas pris winners